Guilherme Almeida Augusto (born 29 January 1993), known as Guilherme Almeida or simply Guilherme, is a Brazilian footballer who plays for Águia de Marabá as a central defender.

Club career
Born in Osasco, São Paulo, Guilherme represented Portuguesa, São Paulo and Palmeiras as a youth. In 2013, he moved to Avaí, but failed to make a first team appearance for the club.

In March 2014 Guilherme was loaned to Tokyo Verdy until December. He returned to Avaí after contributing with no minutes, and was subsequently released.

On 29 January 2015 Guilherme returned to his first club Portuguesa. He made his debut for the club on 28 February, starting and scoring his team's first in a 2–1 away win against Bragantino for the Campeonato Paulista championship.

References

External links

1993 births
Living people
People from Osasco
Brazilian footballers
Association football defenders
Campeonato Brasileiro Série C players
Avaí FC players
Associação Portuguesa de Desportos players
Clube Recreativo e Atlético Catalano players
Sport Club São Paulo players
Águia de Marabá Futebol Clube players
Tokyo Verdy players
Brazilian expatriate footballers
Brazilian expatriate sportspeople in Japan
Expatriate footballers in Japan
Footballers from São Paulo (state)